WIYD (1260 AM) is a radio station broadcasting a Classic Country radio format. It is licensed to Palatka, Florida, and is currently owned by Natkim Radio, LLC.  It features programming from Westwood One.

The FCC first licensed this station to begin operations on June 24, 1947, using callsign WWPF.

References

External links

IYD
Country radio stations in the United States
1947 establishments in Florida
Radio stations established in 1947